Stefania Bertelè (born 22 June 1957) is an Italian ice dancer. She competed in the ice dance event at the 1976 Winter Olympics.

References

1957 births
Living people
Italian female ice dancers
Olympic figure skaters of Italy
Figure skaters at the 1976 Winter Olympics
Figure skaters from Milan